Throgs Neck Light in Throggs Neck, the Bronx, New York, was a wooden lighthouse that was replaced by an iron skeletal tower that is still there. The lighthouse protects ships in the Long Island Sound from running up against the rocks.

The lighthouse is located on the northeasterly side of Fort Schuyler, southeasterly end of Throgs Neck and on the northerly side of the entrance from Long Island Sound into the East River.

 Tower Shape / Markings / Pattern: White, square, pyramidal,
 skeleton iron tower; lantern, black (1890); Red brick cylindrical tower (1906)
 Height:  (1890);  (1906)

Chronology
 Original wooden lighthouse established in 1827.  It was torn down during the construction of the fort.
 A new wooden tower replaced the original lighthouse in 1835.  It remained in service until 1890.
 Replaced by a skeletal tower in 1890.
 An oil house was built in 1896.
 Skeletal tower replaced in 1906 with a 35-foot red brick tower.
 Light discontinued in 1934 and replaced by a small skeleton tower surmounted with a small signal lamp.

References

External links
 Throgs Neck Lighthouse - from Lighthousefriends.com
 
 Throgs Neck Lighthouse - at the National Lighthouse Museum
 

Lighthouses completed in 1827
Lighthouses completed in 1835
Lighthouses completed in 1890
Lighthouses completed in 1906
Lighthouses in New York City
1827 establishments in New York (state)
Transportation buildings and structures in the Bronx
Throggs Neck, Bronx
Government buildings in the Bronx